The Sewanee Tigers football team represents Sewanee: The University of the South in the sport of American football. The Tigers compete in NCAA Division III as members of the Southern Athletic Association (SAA).

Three Sewanee Tigers are members of the College Football Hall of Fame: Henry Seibels, Henry D. Phillips, and Frank Juhan.

History
The Sewanee Tigers were pioneers in American intercollegiate athletics and possessed the Deep South's preeminent football program in the 1890s. Ellwood Wilson is considered the "founder of Sewanee football." Their 1899 football team had perhaps the best season in college football history, winning all 12 of their games, 11 by shutout, and outscoring their opponents 322-10. Five of those wins, all shutouts, came in a six-day period while on a  trip by train. Ten of their 12 opponents, including all five of their road trip victims, remain major college football powers to this day. In 2012, the College Football Hall of Fame held a vote of the greatest historic teams of all time, where the 1899 Iron Men beat the 1961 Alabama Crimson Tide as the greatest team of all time.

Sewanee was a charter member of the Southern Intercollegiate Athletic Association in 1894, and also a charter member of the Southeastern Conference upon its formation in 1932, but by this time its athletic program had declined precipitously and Sewanee never won a conference football game in the eight years it was an SEC member. The Tigers were shut out 26 times in their 37 SEC games, and were outscored by a combined total of 1163–84.

When vice chancellor Benjamin Ficklin Finney, who had reportedly objected to Sewanee joining the SEC, left his position in 1938, the leading candidate was Alexander Guerry, a former president of the University of Chattanooga. According to a university historian, Guerry agreed to come to Sewanee only if the school stopped awarding athletic scholarships. In 1940, two years after Guerry's arrival, Sewanee withdrew from the SEC and subsequently deemphasized varsity athletics. Guerry's stance is sometimes credited as an early step toward the 1973 creation of NCAA Division III, which prohibits athletic scholarships.

Yea, Sewanee's Right!
"Yea, Sewanee's Right!" is the surviving last line of an old football cheer: "Rip `em up! Tear `em up! Leave `em in the lurch. Down with the heathen. Up with the Church.–Yea, Sewanee's Right!" The heathen may have been the Methodists of Vanderbilt which would date the cheer in the 1890s; the cheer was sometimes also used against Hampden-Sydney. Now used as an alternative motto and often shouted at the end of the Alma Mater. When used with the Alma Mater it is preceded by the transitional formula of an extended pause followed by "Yea, Sewanee's Right!"

Conference history
 Southern Intercollegiate Athletic Association: 1895–1900, 1902–1924
 Southern Conference: 1924–1932
 Southeastern Conference: 1932–1940
 Independent: 1941, 1946–1961
 Southern Collegiate Athletic Conference: 1962–2012
 Southern Athletic Association: 2012–present

Conference championships
Sewanee has won 15 conference championships, nine outright and six shared.

† denotes shared championship

All-Time Sewanee Tigers football team

First team
 E Jenks Gillem
 E Delmas Gooch
 T Jay Dee Patton
 T Thug Murray
 G Henry D. Phillips
 G Ephraim Kirby-Smith
 C Frank Juhan
 QB Chigger Browne
 HB Aubrey Lanier
 HB Henry Seibels
 FB Ormond Simkins

Second team
 E Silas Williams
 E Rupert Colmore
 T Lex Stone
 T Frank Faulkinberry
 G Laurie Thompson
 G Bob Taylor Dobbins
 C George Watkins
 QB John Scarbrough
 HB Frank Shipp
 HB Bill Coughlan
 FB Reuben S. Parker

References

 
American football teams established in 1891
1891 establishments in Tennessee